Julie Halard-Decugis was the defending champion but did not compete this year, as she retired from professional tennis at the end of the 2000 season.

First-seeded Monica Seles won the title by defeating second-seeded Tamarine Tanasugarn 6–3, 6–2 in the final.

Seeds
The top two seeds received a bye into the second round.

Draw

Finals

Top half

Bottom half

References
 ITF tournament profile

2001 Japan Open Tennis Championships